SHCA under President of Azerbaijan (in Azerbaijani: MIDA - Mənzil İnşaatı Dövlət Agentliyi) is a central executive authority that established to effectively utilize the funds allocated for the construction of multistory residential buildings, and provide the low and middle income citizens and young families of the Republic of Azerbaijan with preferential housing. It also implements state policy and regulation in urban planning, design and architecture. Samir Nuriyev is the head of the agency.

History 
The agency was set up on 11 April 2016 based on a presidential decree which initially aims to construct buildings that cost less for Azerbaijani citizens while considering protection of environment and requirements of modern architectural style. On November 24, 2016, State Housing Development Agency Legal Entity established based on another presidential decree which operates under SHCA. The Charter of the State Housing Development Agency of the Republic of Azerbaijan was approved on 7 February 2017 based on Decree of the President of the Republic of Azerbaijan No 1819.

Projects 
The Hovsan residential complex will be built in Surakhani district, near the town of Hovsan which is approximately 2 km far from Caspian Sea. The complex is expected to comprise 11 multi-family buildings that will have 2962 apartment (280 are single room, 1401 are two-room, 980 are triples, and 301 are four-room apartments).

Yasamal residential complex comprises total number of 29 buildings which consisted of 1843 apartments. There will be also school building and kindergarten. The complex will be built over 11.6 ha area.

International relations 
The Agency has bilateral cooperation with the corresponding organizations in Germany, Singapore, Turkey, Russia, Brazil, Mexico, and Morocco. The agency also collaborating with some international financial institutions and large financial companies for looking for ways to avoid economic risks and reduce construction costs of buildings.

Decrees about the agency 

 Decree of the President of the Republic of Azerbaijan amending on the Decree of the President of the Republic of Azerbaijan No.1113 of November 16, 2016 "On Some Issues Related to the Activities of the State Housing Construction Agency of the Republic of Azerbaijan"
 Decree of the President of the Republic of Azerbaijan "On some issues related to ensuring the activities of the State Housing Construction Agency of the Republic of Azerbaijan
 Decree of the President of the Republic of Azerbaijan about amending to the Decree of the President of the Republic of Azerbaijan No 940 of June 22, 2016 "On Some Issues of Mortgage Loans in the Republic of Azerbaijan"
 Decree of the President of the Republic of Azerbaijan on the approval of the "Regulations on the System of Preferential Housing"
 Decree of the President of the Republic of Azerbaijan "On the Establishment and Operation of the State Housing Construction Agency of the Republic of Azerbaijan" April 11, 2016, No. 858.

References

External links 
 The State Housing Development Agency

Government agencies of Azerbaijan